Dr. Graeme Cecil Gunn AM (born 1933 in Hamilton, Victoria) is an Australian architect and former Dean of the School of Architecture at RMIT.

Notable projects

Slorach Residence 

Construction Date: 2009

The encompassing living environment of the Hamilton Courtyard House is achieved through the union of built form, spatial sequences, landscape and scale.

Winter Park 

Construction Date: 1971

Winter Park was Graeme's first cluster housing project. It was designed and implemented in association with Merchant Builders Pty Ltd in 1971 and has subsequently remained a seminal departure from the traditional method of suburban subdivision. Winter Park is now on the Heritage Victoria list and in 2007 was adjudged by an expert panel, consisting mostly of architects, as one of the 29 most worthy buildings produced since the inauguration of the first AIA awards.
The basic tenet of the cluster housing concept is that of a comprehensively planned development in which a group of houses are sited to optimise available land in a much more efficient and environmentally sensitive manner than that provided by the normal rectangular grid lot suburban subdivision. Excess land is aggregated to provide communal open space. Houses are sited to relate sympathetically with each other, to optimise privacy, solar orientation, views and physical conditions.

The Plumbers & Gasfitters Union Building 

Construction Date: 1970

Located at 52 Victoria Street Melbourne, the Plumbers & Gasfitters Union building is known as the most persisting and noticeable landmark of Brutalism. The building was completed in 1970 by Graeme Gunn and his creative collaboration with Merchant Builders and landscape architect Ellis Stones. The design itself was architecturally intended to be up to date. The facade is formed of concrete in bold expressionistic forms with dark smoked glazing that intensify the sculptural quality of the construction. Structurally designed to receive an extra floor when needed, the building consists of a car parking and mechanical services area, one main office floor housing the clients, conference room and lobby, and one office of lettable space. For the internal finishes, walls, concrete block work, and stud frame sheeted with plywood are painted. The addition of signage on the building is slightly unsympathetic to the building's initial character.

Baronda Residence 

Construction Date: 1968

The design is based on a 2700 orthogonal matrix using natural tree trunks, some 10 metres long farmed from a local plantation owned by Sir Roy Grounds and Ken Myer.

The vertical and horizontal grid of the matrix defines the spaces, the floors of which radiate from the central staircase, each floor raise a half level above the previous and in a location 90-degree different from the one below. Services are minimal, there being no public utilities (gas, water, electricity or sewerage). The timber theme generated by the structure is continued with infill timber studs within the pole grid and clad internally and externally with timber boarding. The floors are EX 50x100 mm tongue and grooved planks spanning 1350 mm. These, in turn form the ceilings for those rooms having a full height below. Ceilings directly below the roof consist of sisal lining over 150mm square wire mesh.
Some years ago the owner of this property and some of adjacent properties along the coast deeded the contiguous properties as part of a state park to the NSW government to ensure retention of the pristine coastal environment, reserved for public use only.

Townhouses - 76 Molesworth Street, Kew

Construction Date: 1968

Designed for family living these six concrete block, Brutalist style townhouses, consist of three bedrooms, two living areas and a double carport (now converted to a garage) with an open private courtyard. The building expresses simple construction materials of concrete for the main structure, timber for the roof structure and metal deck as the roof cladding. Off-form concrete balconies project from the concrete block building, with timber handrails.

The Townhouses are significant as an important design progression in the re-thinking of suburban, cluster style living. The houses are included on the Schedule to the Heritage Overlay and Graded as "A" class.

Today: This project retains many of its original features and remains structurally intact, and has only received minor upgrading of timber handrails and window frames.

Award: 1970 Bronze Medal Award, Victorian Chapter of the RAIA. In the Boroondara Municipality only 3 other residential projects have won this award.

Selected other projects

Biles Residence

Location: Melbourne, Victoria

Construction Date: 2006

Austin Vineyard

Location: Sutherland Creek, Victoria

Construction Date: 2006

Crawford River Wineries

Location: Condah, Victoria

Construction Date: 2002

Portland Aerodrome

Location: Portland, Victoria

Construction Date: 1981

Prahran Market

Location: Prahran, Victoria

Construction Date: 1979

Awards
2012 Member (AM) in the General Division of the Order of Australia
2011 Australian Institute of Architects Gold Medal
2007 25 Year Award for Outstanding Architecture - Plumbers and Gas fitters
2001 President's award for Lifetime Contribution to Victorian Architecture
1996 Honorary Doctorate of Architecture, RMIT
1988 The Royal Australian Institute of Architects Merit Awards for Outstanding Architecture - Bridge Hotel Mordialloc
1988 The Royal Australian Institute of Architects Merit Awards for Outstanding Architecture - RACV Club refurbishments
1984 The Royal Australian Institute of Architects Merit Awards for Outstanding Architecture - Melbourne City Baths
1983 The Royal Australian Institute of Architects Merit Awards for Outstanding Architecture - Portland Aerodrome Terminal Building
1982 The Royal Australian Institute of Architects Merit Awards for Outstanding Architecture - Prahran Municipal Market
1980 Victorian Architecture Medal : Ararat Arts Activity Centre
1970 Bronze Medal Award, Victorian Chapter of the RAIA - Townhouses - 76 Molesworth Street, Kew
1970 Royal Australian Institute of Architects Citation - Plumbers & Gasfitters
1971 Royal Australian Institute of Architects Citation - Royal South Yarra Lawn Tennis Club
1975 Royal Australian Institute of Architects Citation - Winter Park cluster housing
1976 Royal Australian Institute of Architects Citation - AMWSU Headquarters
1976 Royal Australian Institute of Architects Citation - Chelsworth Park Pavilion
1966 Bronze Medal Award, Victorian Chapter of the RAIA - Richardson House

Publications
2010 – present

Sullivan, Leanne, Who’s Who in Australia 2012, Crown Content Pty Ltd, Melbourne p. 958
Bernstone, Rachel "Pulse" In Design; Issue 47 (2011) pp. 196–197
Rizzo R, "Square Roots" Architectural Review Australia; Summer 2010/2011 pp. 78–85
Harrison S, 'A Place in the Sun' Thames & Hudson Australia 2010 pp. 168–173
Tonkin P, "Revisited Baronda House" Houses; Issue 77 (Dec 2010) pp. 130–136
Architect Victoria, Victorian Architecture Awards 2010, p. 101
O’Brian K, "Fine style dissolves boundaries", The Age, 24 April 2010, Domain pp. 11–13
Gunn G, "Graeme Gunn", Architect Victoria, Summer 2010, pp. 22–23

2000-2009

Goad P, "Melbourne Architecture", Watermark Architectural Guides, revised and expanded 2009
Mornement, A. & Biles, A., Infill: New Houses for Urban Sites, London: Laurence King Publishing Ltd., 2009
Architect Victoria, RAIA Victoria Awards 2007, p. 54
Crafti S, "Delivering the Unexpected", InDesign; No 25, May 2006 p. 98
Gunn G, "Occupation"’, Architecture Victoria: Winter 2005, p. 12
Gunn G, "A Case for Sustainability", Architect Victoria Winter 2003, pp. 21–23
Bertram N, "A Short History of Melbourne Architecture" (Book Review), Architecture Australia, Dec 2002, p. 46
McDougall I, "President's Prize", Architect Victoria, Winter 2001 p. 8
Selenitsch A, "The Gunn Atrium", Transition; No. 61-62, 2000, pp. 140–151

1990-1999

Giannini E, "The Speculative Suburb: What vision for our suburbs?", Architect, Mar 1991, pp. 5–9
"Interior Design: The Crossley Hotel", Architecture Australia, Vol 80 No 2 Mar 1991, pp. 67–69
Dickinson M, "Putting Off the Ritz", Belle, No 111 Jun/Jul 1992 pp. 96–101
Friis Clark A, "Corporate Headquarters: Haymes Paint", Corporate and Office Design, Vol 8 No 4, 1992 pp. 140–142
"Bold Roofscapes", BCME, Vol 34 No 21 Number 242 Oct 1993 pp. 7–8
"Case studies: Bold Roofscapes Strike a Chord in Steel", Architecture Australia, Vol 82 No 5 Sep/Oct 1993, p. 76

1980-1989

Gunn G, "A No- frills Lifestyle" [Redlich House] Australian Home Beautiful, June 1980
"State Library/ Museum Competition: Graeme Gunn and Perrott Lyon Mathieson", Architect, Apr 1986, pp. 14–15
"Survey: Melbourne Bayside Project", Constructional Review, Vol 60 No 3 Aug 1987, P..5
Calhoun S, "Haven in South Yarra" Landscape Australia, No 4 Nov 1988 pp. 387–390
Clerehan N, "RAIA Victorian Chapter Awards 1988: Commercial Alterations: Winner", Architect, Aug 1988, pp. 11–14
Rijavec I, "RAIA Victorian Chapter Awards 1988: Interior Architecture: Winner", Architect, Aug 1988, pp. 25, 27-28
Bagnall D, "Simple Arithmetic", Vogue Living, Vol 23 No 5, Jun/Jul 1989, pp. 114–117
"Interiors: Dual Purpose Art Gallery", Architecture Australia, Vol 78 No 2 Mar 1989, pp. 91–92
"Interiors: RACV Club Refurbishment", Architecture Australia, Vol 78 No 3 Apr 1989, pp. 66–67

1970-1979

"Townhouses, 76 Molesworth Street, Kew, Victoria", Architecture in Australia, Volume 59, number 5, October 1970.
"New Union Building", Architect, volume 3, number 14, July - August 1971
"Union Headquarters", Constructional Review, Volume 44, number 3, August 1971
Gunn G, "Winter Park [& Elliston], for Merchant Builders" In McKay, I. et al., Living and Partly Living, Housing in Australia, Nelson, Melbourne 1971
Gunn G, "Baronda, House for David Yencken" in McKay I, Living and Partly Living, Housing in Australia, Melbourne 1971
Gunn G, "Molesworth Street Townhouses for Merchant Builders", in McKay I, Living and Partly Living, Housing in Australia, Nelson, Melbourne 1971
Boyd R, "A Lead from the Plumbers", The Sunday Australian, 6 June 1971.
"Office, Plumbers and Gasfitters Employees Union", Architecture in Australia, Volume 61, Number 4, August 1972
"Awards", [Royal South Yarra Tennis Club], Architect, Volume 3, number 5, November/December
"AMWU Office Building; Fresh Approach, Fitting Result", Architecture Today, October–November
"Gunn Hayball, A Scheme to make Everyone Happy" [Prahran Market], Melbourne Times 31 July 1974
Gunn G, Winter Park cluster housing, in Tanner H, Australian Housing in the Seventies, Ure Smith Sydney, 1976
Gunn G, Bracklyn Apartments, in Tanner, H, Australian Housing in the Seventies, Ure Smith Sydney, 1976
Gunn G, Baronda House for David Yencken, in Yencken, Davis & Gunn, Perception, Expectation and Experience, in Seddon G. & Davis M. Man and Landscape in Australia, Towards an Ecological Vision, Government Printing Service, Canberra, 1976

1960-1969

Clarke J, "Search for an Australian House [Gas & Fuel Competition House]", The Age, 5 April 1965
"Residence at Essendon, Vic.", Architecture and Arts, volume 13, number 5, May 1965
"House Folds inside its own Allotment" [Stradwick House], The Australian Home Beautiful, October
"Victorian Architecture Medal 1966, House", [Richardson House], Architecture in Australia, Volume 55, number 3, May 1966,
Cross Section No. 161, March 1966
Cross Section No. 166, August 1966
"Domestic Award, House at Essendon", [Richardson House], Architecture & Arts, Volume 14, Number 3, March 1966, pp. 18
Paterson, J, Yencken, D., & Gunn, G, A Mansion or no House, Report for the U.D.I.A. on the consequences of planning standards and their impact on land and housing, Hawthorn Press Melbourne 1967
Gunn G, "Merchant Builder Houses, Melbourne, Victoria", in Sowden H, Towards an Australian Architecture, Sydney 1968.
Gunn G, "Pine-mont Preschool, Ringwood, Victoria", in Sowden H, Towards an Australian Architecture, Sydney 1968

References

External links
Gunn Dyring Architects 

1933 births
Date of birth missing (living people)
Living people
Members of the Order of Australia
Recipients of the Royal Australian Institute of Architects’ Gold Medal
People from Hamilton, Victoria